1-Naphthoic acid is an organic compound of the formula C10H7CO2H.  It is one of two isomeric monocarboxylic acids of naphthalene, the other one being 2-naphthoic acid.  1-Naphthoic acid is a frequent substrate for C-H activation reactions.  In general the hydroxynaphthoic acids are far more useful than the parent.  It can be prepared by carboxylation of the Grignard reagent generated from 1-Bromonaphthalene.

References

1-Naphthyl compounds
Carboxylic acids